Carp Lake Township is a civil township of Ontonagon County in the U.S. state of Michigan. The population of the township was 582 at the 2020 census. Part of Porcupine Mountains Wilderness State Park is within the township.

Carp Lake Township is the westernmost municipality in the United States to use Eastern Standard Time.

Communities
Carp Lake began around a copper mine in 1858.
White Pine is a census-designated place and unincorporated community in the township.

Geography
It is the westernmost municipality in the United States to be in the Eastern Time Zone.

The township contains a substantial shoreline on Lake Superior.

Demographics
As of the census of 2000, there were 891 people, 411 households, and 274 families residing in the township. The population density was 4.0 per square mile (1.5/km2). There were 615 housing units at an average density of 2.7 per square mile (1.1/km2). The racial makeup of the township was 95.96% White, 1.91% Native American, 0.11% Asian, 0.79% from other races, and 1.23% from two or more races. Hispanic or Latino of any race were 1.57% of the population. 22.1% were of Finnish, 14.7% German, 9.0% Polish, 8.9% English, 7.2% French, 6.2% Italian and 5.0% Irish ancestry according to Census 2000.

There were 411 households, out of which 20.9% had children under the age of 18 living with them, 56.9% were married couples living together, 5.1% had a female householder with no husband present, and 33.1% were non-families. 28.7% of all households were made up of individuals, and 14.1% had someone living alone who was 65 years of age or older. The average household size was 2.17 and the average family size was 2.59.

In the township the population was spread out, with 18.9% under the age of 18, 4.5% from 18 to 24, 21.8% from 25 to 44, 31.5% from 45 to 64, and 23.3% who were 65 years of age or older. The median age was 48 years. For every 100 females, there were 96.7 males. For every 100 females age 18 and over, there were 103.7 males.

The median income for a household in the township was $26,731, and the median income for a family was $31,500. Males had a median income of $30,385 versus $21,806 for females. The per capita income for the township was $16,333. About 7.8% of families and 10.3% of the population were below the poverty line, including 16.1% of those under age 18 and 7.4% of those age 65 or over.

References

Notes

Sources

Townships in Ontonagon County, Michigan
Townships in Michigan
Michigan populated places on Lake Superior